Barnwood is an eastern suburb of Gloucester, lying about  from the centre of the city, and former civil parish, now in the unparished area of Gloucester, in the Gloucester district, in the county of Gloucestershire, England.

Barnwood was originally a small village on the Roman road that links Gloucester with Hucclecote, Brockworth and Cirencester. The Church of England parish church is dedicated to St Lawrence.

The Generation Design and Construction Division of the CEGB became the centre of a new office development when it moved here in the early 1970s. This then became the corporate headquarters of Nuclear Electric, and later the English offices of the (nominally Scottish-based) British Energy, which in 2009 became part of EDF Energy. Other major companies in Barnwood include Claranet, Cheltenham & Gloucester and InterCall. There is also a Holiday Inn, Sainsbury's, Virgin Active and Tenpin Ltd in the area.

Barnwood Park School is a secondary school.

Arboretum

Barnwood Arboretum is set on the grounds of the Barnwood House Hospital which was closed in 1968 and finally demolished in 2000. The arboretum consists of an enclosed woodland area that is cared for and conserved by Gloucester City Council in conjunction with the Friends of Barnwood Arboretum (FOBA). The Arboretum's main entrance is off Church Lane, Barnwood. It has with various habitats including grassland and wetland, and is set amongst a collection of mature native and exotic specimen trees.

The Friends of Barnwood Arboretum & Park organise events throughout the year to encourage local citizens to use the area in an educational manner.

Football
Barnwood United Football Club plays its home games at Walls Club, Barnwood. The club's first team compete in Gloucestershire Northern Senior 2, and the reserve side compete in Stroud League 3.

Notable people 
Samuel and Anne Bubb, who were grandparents of the inventor Sir Charles Wheatstone (1802–75), lived at Barnwood Manor House. Biographical notes of 1887 say that Sir Charles stated that he was born in the house and lived there as a young child, and this was the scene of some of his earliest experiments. In later years Wheatstone often returned to Barnwood. A local public house is named The Wheatstone Inn after him.

The architect Frederick S. Waller (1822–1905), sometime resident architect at Gloucester Cathedral, lived and died at Barnwood.

Civil parish 
On 1 April 1966 the parish was abolished and became part of Gloucester, Hucclecote and Upton St. Leonards. In 1961 the parish had a population of 2160.

References

External links

Areas of Gloucester
Former civil parishes in Gloucestershire